Barbarella may refer to:

Arts and entertainment
 Barbarella (character), the title character of a comic book created by Jean-Claude Forest
 Barbarella (film), a 1968 film based on the comic book starring Jane Fonda
 Barbarella (musical) a 2004 musical based on the film

Other uses
 Barbarella (band), a Dutch female pop trio
 Barbarellas, an Irish pop duo
 Tommy Barbarella, American keyboardist Thomas Elm, a member of New Power Generation
 "Barbarella" (song), a song by Scott Weiland from 12 Bar Blues
 Barbarella: the 80's Musical, a 2015 musical
 "Barbarella", a song from the album Illumina by Alisha's Attic
 "Barbarella", a 1983 song by The Bongos
 Barbarella (festival), a Dominican electronic music festival

Places
 Barbarella (Växjö) a defunct discoteque in Sweden
 Barbarella's, a nightclub and music venue in Birmingham, England

Objects
 Barbarella (rocket), a German hybrid rocket launched from the Barbara drilling platform in the Baltic Sea